Alexander Smith (7 November 1873 – January 1908) was a Scottish footballer who made 45 appearances in the Football League playing for Lincoln City. He played as an inside right or left half. He also played in his native Scotland for St Mirren and Third Lanark, and in the Southern League for Swindon Town.

References

1873 births
1908 deaths
Footballers from West Dunbartonshire
Association football inside forwards
Association football wing halves
St Mirren F.C. players
Lincoln City F.C. players
Third Lanark A.C. players
Swindon Town F.C. players
English Football League players
Scottish Football League players
Southern Football League players
Scottish footballers